Léon Fourneau (born 17 March 1900, date of death unknown) was a Belgian middle-distance runner. He competed in the 1500 metres at the 1920 Summer Olympics and the 1924 Summer Olympics.

References

1900 births
Year of death missing
Athletes (track and field) at the 1920 Summer Olympics
Athletes (track and field) at the 1924 Summer Olympics
Belgian male middle-distance runners
Olympic athletes of Belgium
Place of birth missing